The Skilled Migrant Category (SMC) is the way skilled migrants qualify to gain Permanent Residence (PR) to New Zealand. It is managed by Immigration New Zealand under the Immigration Act [2009], and currently has a target of attracting 26,000 migrants per year.

The SMC replaced in the late 1990s a  flawed system that had resulted thousands of supposedly skilled migrants coming into NZ, who were subsequently unable to work in their skilled professions in NZ due to various factors, such as their overseas qualifications not being recognised in NZ, were unable to get occupational registration in NZ, or were unable to speak English.

Introduction
The SMC combines both a points-based system as well as minimum requirements. While the points can vary (although the minimum points allowed under law is 100), the minimum requirements are that one be aged 55 or under, be healthy, be of good character, and speak English (or pay an English Language Tuition Bond).

The Points system
Under the SMC, points are allocated for age, work experience, employment in New Zealand and qualifications, amongst other categories.

Skilled employment
For skilled employment, an applicant gets 50 points for either skilled job offer in New Zealand, or if the applicant is already working in a skilled job in New Zealand for less than 12 months. If the applicant is working in a skilled job in New Zealand for more than 12 months, they get 60 points. If the job is outside the Auckland Region, a further 30 bonus points are allocated.

However, INZ only recognises certain jobs as being skilled, and these occupations are contained on Appendix 6 in the INZ manual. In addition, the applicant must also meet the work experience and qualifications prescribed to that job by the Australian and New Zealand Standard Classification of Occupations (ANZSCO).

Qualifications
For qualifications, an applicant gets 40 points recognised level 4-6 qualification (e.g. trade qualification, diploma), 50 points for a recognised level 7 or 8 qualification (e.g. bachelor's degree, bachelor's degree with honours), and 60 points for recognised level 9 or 10 post-graduate qualifications (master's degree, doctorate). Foreign qualifications must be verified by the New Zealand Qualifications Authority before points can be claimed, although there are numerous exceptions to this rule. This process can take several months.

If the applicant has studied in NZ, they can get 10 points for either two years full-time study in New Zealand completing a recognised bachelor's degree New Zealand qualification, or completing one year of full-time study in New Zealand completing a recognised post-graduate New Zealand qualification (15 points for 2 years' post-graduate study).

Work experience in skilled employment
Under this category, one gets the following points for skilled employment in certain countries:
10 points: 2 years
15 points: 4 years
20 points: 6 years
25 points: 8 years
30 points: 10 years

In addition to this, the applicant can also get bonus points for skilled work experience in New Zealand, five points for one year's experience, 10 points for two years' experience, and 15 points for three or more years' experience.

If the work experience is in an area of absolute skills shortage, for 2 to 5 years' work experience the applicant gets 10 points, and for 6 or more years' experience 15 points. However, to qualify for these points, the job must be on the Long-term Skill Shortage List, and the applicant must have the prescribed amount of work experience and qualifications.

The immigration officer will need 2 forms of evidence to prove work experience, such as payslips, bank statements (showing one's pay), letters from the Inland Revenue Department (tax), Work and Income New Zealand (social security) deduction documents, work references, etc.

Age
Points for age are allocated on the following basis:
30 points: 20–30 years
25 points: 30–39 years
20 points: 40–44 years
10 points: 45–49 years
5 points: 50–55 years

Close family
Under this category, an applicant can get 10 points for having a close family member residing in New Zealand. However, the relative is limited to either an adult child or adult brother or sister, or parent of the applicant or the applicant's spouse.

The family member must also not only be a permanent resident of New Zealand, but they have done so for the last 3 years. For this category the applicant must get their relative to provide numerous banks statements, bills, etc., for each of the last 3 years as proof of residence in NZ.

Spouse
If an applicant's spouse has a skilled job or skilled job offer in NZ, they can get 20 points. Also if the spouse holds a level 4-6 qualification they can get 10 points, and if their partner holds a level 7+ qualification they get 20 points.

The Selection Process
The process commences with lodging an Expression of Interest form, either on a paper form or online, and paying the appropriate fee. As of September 2014, it costs NZ$650 to make a paper application and NZ$530 for an online application.

INZ makes a selection out of the pool. Applicants with 160 points or more are generally automatically accepted without having to go into the pool.

Once an applicant's EOI has been selected, they are notified by mail. An immigration officer is then assigned to the application. Recently this has taken between 6 and 9 months. By July 2014 INZ is aiming to assign a case officer within 2 weeks.

When the immigration officer is assigned, it is requested that one verifies their claims in their EOI, plus supply a medical, a police clearance certificate, and proof of English ability. Four months are given to submit all this, otherwise the application lapses.

After all this is provided and verified, one is then given a letter saying one is approved for Residence. However, residence is not granted until the applicant's passport is sent to INZ, and the prescribed fee is paid. Three months are given to do this, otherwise the offer of residence lapses.

References

External links
Immigration NZ Skilled Migrant Category
Immigration NZ Points Indicator
Appendix 6: Skilled Occupations Immigration NZ Points Indicator
Occupations that need Registration in NZ
ANZSCO (Australian and New Zealand Standard Classification of Occupations)
NZ Qualifications Authority

Immigration to New Zealand